The following is a list of Lobelia species accepted by the Plants of the World Online as of January 2021:

A

 Lobelia aberdarica R.E.Fr. & T.C.E.Fr.
 Lobelia acrochila (E.Wimm.) E.B.Knox
 Lobelia acuminata Sw.
 Lobelia acutidens Hook.f.
 Lobelia adnexa E.Wimm.
 Lobelia agrestis E.Wimm.
 Lobelia aguana E.Wimm.
 Lobelia alpina Vell.
 Lobelia alsinoides Lam.
 Lobelia alticaulis Proctor
 Lobelia amoena Michx.
 Lobelia anatina E.Wimm.
 Lobelia anceps L.f.
 Lobelia andrewsii Lammers
 Lobelia angulata G.Forst.
 Lobelia apalachicolensis D.D.Spauld., Barger & H.E.Horne
 Lobelia appendiculata A.DC.
 Lobelia aquaemontis E.Wimm.
 Lobelia aquatica Cham.
 Lobelia archboldiana (Merr. & L.M.Perry) Moeliono
 Lobelia archeri N.G.Walsh
 Lobelia ardisiandroides Schltr.
 Lobelia arnhemiaca E.Wimm.
 Lobelia assurgens L.
 Lobelia aurita (Brandegee) T.J.Ayers
 Lobelia australiensis Lammers
 Lobelia ayersiae Rzed.

B

 Lobelia bambuseti R.E.Fr. & T.C.E.Fr.
 Lobelia barkerae E.Wimm.
 Lobelia barnsii Exell
 Lobelia baumannii Engl.
 Lobelia beaugleholei Albr.
 Lobelia benthamii F.Muell.
 Lobelia bequaertii De Wild.
 Lobelia berlandieri A.DC.
 Lobelia biflora Rzed.
 Lobelia bipinnatifida Rzed.
 Lobelia blantyrensis E.Wimm.
 Lobelia boivinii Sond.
 Lobelia boninensis Koidz.
 Lobelia borneensis (Hemsl.) Moeliono
 Lobelia boykinii Torr. & Gray ex A.DC.
 Lobelia brachyantha Merr. & L.M.Perry
 Lobelia brasiliensis A.O.S.Vieira & G.J.Sheph.
 Lobelia brevifolia Nutt. ex A.DC.
 Lobelia bridgesii Hook. & Arn.
 Lobelia brigittalis E.H.L.Krause
 Lobelia browniana Schult. 
 Lobelia bryoides Willd. ex Schult.
 Lobelia bryophila E.Wimm.
 Lobelia burttii E.A.Bruce

C

 Lobelia cacuminis Britton & P.Wilson
 Lobelia caeciliae E.Wimm.
 Lobelia caerulea Sims
 Lobelia caledoniana C.D.Adams
 Lobelia calochlamys (Donn.Sm.) Wilbur
 Lobelia camporum Pohl
 Lobelia canbyi A.Gray
 Lobelia capillifolia (C.Presl) A.DC.
 Lobelia cardinalis L.
 Lobelia carens Heenan
 Lobelia caudata (Griseb.) Urb.
 Lobelia cavaleriei H.Lév.
 Lobelia chamaedryfolia (C.Presl) A.DC.
 Lobelia chamaepitys Lam.
 Lobelia cheiranthus L.
 Lobelia cheranganiensis Thulin
 Lobelia chevalieri Danguy
 Lobelia chinensis Lour.
 Lobelia chireensis A.Rich.
 Lobelia christii Urb.
 Lobelia ciliata A.Spreng. ex C.Presl
 Lobelia circaeoides (C.Presl) A.DC.
 Lobelia cirsiifolia Lam.
 Lobelia cladlomesa Raf.
 Lobelia clavata E.Wimm.
 Lobelia claviflora Albr. & R.W.Jobson
 Lobelia cleistogamoides N.G.Walsh & Albr.
 Lobelia cliffortiana L.
 Lobelia cobaltica S.Moore
 Lobelia cochleariifolia Diels
 Lobelia collina Kunth
 Lobelia columnaris Hook.f.
 Lobelia comosa L.
 Lobelia comptonii E.Wimm.
 Lobelia concolor R.Br.
 Lobelia conferta Merr. & L.M.Perry
 Lobelia conglobata Lam.
 Lobelia cordifolia Hook. & Arn.
 Lobelia corniculata Thulin
 Lobelia coronopifolia L.
 Lobelia corymbiformis Rzed.
 Lobelia cubana Urb.
 Lobelia cuneifolia Link & Otto
 Lobelia cyanea E.Wimm.
 Lobelia cymbalarioides Engl.
 Lobelia cyphioides Harv.

D

 Lobelia darlingensis (E.Wimm.) Albr.
 Lobelia dasyphylla E.Wimm.
 Lobelia davidii Franch.
 Lobelia deckenii (Asch.) Hemsl.
 Lobelia decurrens Cav.
 Lobelia decurrentifolia (Kuntze) K.Schum.
 Lobelia deleiensis C.E.C.Fisch.
 Lobelia dentata Cav.
 Lobelia diastateoides McVaugh
 Lobelia diazlunae Rzed. & Calderón
 Lobelia dichroma Schltr.
 Lobelia dielsiana E.Wimm.
 Lobelia digitalifolia  (Griseb.) Urb.
 Lobelia dioica R.Br.
 Lobelia dissecta M.B.Moss
 Lobelia divaricata Hook. & Arn.
 Lobelia divergens Rzed.
 Lobelia diversifolia Willd. ex Schult.
 Lobelia djurensis Engl. & Diels
 Lobelia dodiana E.Wimm.
 Lobelia donanensis P.Royen
 Lobelia dopatrioides Kurz
 Lobelia dortmanna L.
 Lobelia douglasiana F.M.Bailey 
 Lobelia dregeana (C.Presl) A.DC.
 Lobelia dressleri Wilbur
 Lobelia drungjiangensis D.Y.Hong
 Lobelia dunbariae Rock
 Lobelia duriprati T.C.E.Fr.

E

 Lobelia ehrenbergii Vatke
 Lobelia ekmanii Urb.
 Lobelia elongata Small
 Lobelia endlichii (E.Wimm.) T.J.Ayers
 Lobelia ensiformis Vell.
 Lobelia erectiuscula H.Hara
 Lobelia erlangeriana Engl.
 Lobelia erinus L.
 Lobelia eryliae C.E.C.Fisch.
 Lobelia esquirolii H.Lév.
 Lobelia eurostos Voigt
 Lobelia eurypoda E.Wimm.
 Lobelia exaltata Pohl
 Lobelia excelsa Bonpl.
 Lobelia exilis Hochst. ex A.Rich.

F

 Lobelia fangiana (E.Wimm.) S.Y.Hu
 Lobelia fastigiata Kunth
 Lobelia fatiscens Heenan
 Lobelia fawcettii Urb.
 Lobelia feayana A.Gray
 Lobelia fenestralis Cav.
 Lobelia fenshamii N.G.Walsh & Albr.
 Lobelia fervens Thunb.
 Lobelia filicaulis (C.Presl) Schönland
 Lobelia filiformis Lam.
 Lobelia filipes E.Wimm.
 Lobelia fissiflora N.G.Walsh
 Lobelia fistulosa Vell.
 Lobelia flaccida (C.Presl) A.DC.
 Lobelia flaccidifolia Small
 Lobelia flexicaulis Rzed. & Calderón
 Lobelia flexuosa (C.Presl) A.DC.
 Lobelia floridana Chapm.
 Lobelia foliiformis T.J.Zhang & D.Y.Hong
 Lobelia fontana Albr. & N.G.Walsh
 Lobelia fugax Heenan, Courtney & P.N.Johnson

G

 Lobelia galpinii Schltr.
 Lobelia gaoligongshanica D.Y.Hong
 Lobelia gattingeri A.Gray
 Lobelia gaudichaudii A.DC.
 Lobelia gelida F.Muell.
 Lobelia georgiana McVaugh
 Lobelia ghiesbreghtii Decne.
 Lobelia gibbosa Labill.
 Lobelia giberroa Hemsl.
 Lobelia gilgii Engl.
 Lobelia gilletii De Wild.
 Lobelia glaberrima Heenan
 Lobelia gladiaria McVaugh
 Lobelia glandulosa Walter
 Lobelia glaucescens E.Wimm.
 Lobelia glazioviana Zahlbr.
 Lobelia gloria-montis Rock
 Lobelia goetzei Diels
 Lobelia goldmanii (Fernald) T.J.Ayers
 Lobelia gouldii W.Fitzg.
 Lobelia gracillima Welw. ex Hiern
 Lobelia grandifolia Britton
 Lobelia graniticola E.Wimm.
 Lobelia grayana E.Wimm.
 Lobelia gregoriana Baker f.
 Lobelia griffithii Hook.f. & Thomson
 Lobelia gruina Cav.
 Lobelia guatemalensis (B.L.Rob. ex Donn.Sm.) Wilbur
 Lobelia guerrerensis Eakes & Lammers
 Lobelia guzmanii Rzed.
 Lobelia gypsophila T.J.Ayers

H

 Lobelia hainanensis E.Wimm.
 Lobelia harrisii Urb.
 Lobelia hartlaubii Buchenau
 Lobelia hartwegii Benth. ex A.DC.
 Lobelia hassleri Zahlbr.
 Lobelia hederacea Cham.
 Lobelia henodon E.Wimm.
 Lobelia henricksonii M.C.Johnst.
 Lobelia hereroensis Schinz
 Lobelia heteroclita McVaugh
 Lobelia heterophylla Labill.
 Lobelia heyneana Schult.
 Lobelia hilaireana (Kanitz) E.Wimm.
 Lobelia hillebrandii Rock
 Lobelia hintoniorum B.L.Turner
 Lobelia hirtipes E.Wimm.
 Lobelia holotricha E.Wimm.
 Lobelia holstii Engl.
 Lobelia homophylla E.Wimm.
 Lobelia hongiana Q.F.Wang & G.W.Hu
 Lobelia horombensis E.Wimm.
 Lobelia hotteana Judd & Skean
 Lobelia humistrata F.Muell. ex Benth.
 Lobelia humpatensis E.Wimm.
 Lobelia hypnodes E.Wimm. ex McVaugh
 Lobelia hypoleuca Hillebr.

I

 Lobelia illota McVaugh
 Lobelia imberbis (Griseb.) Urb.
 Lobelia imperialis E.Wimm.
 Lobelia inconspicua A.Rich.
 Lobelia inflata L.
 Lobelia innominata Rendle
 Lobelia intercedens (E.Wimm.) Thulin
 Lobelia irasuensis Planch. & Oerst.
 Lobelia irrigua R.Br.
 Lobelia iteophylla C.Y.Wu

J

 Lobelia jaliscensis McVaugh
 Lobelia jasionoides (A.DC.) E.Wimm.

K

 Lobelia kalmii L.
 Lobelia kalobaensis E.Wimm. ex Thulin
 Lobelia × kauaensis (A.Gray) A.Heller
 Lobelia kirkii R.E.Fr.
 Lobelia knoblochii T.J.Ayers
 Lobelia koolauensis (Hosaka & Fosberg) Lammers
 Lobelia kraussii Graham
 Lobelia kundelungensis Thulin

L

 Lobelia lammersiana P.Biju, Josekutty & Augustine
 Lobelia langeana Dusén
 Lobelia lasiocalycina E.Wimm.
 Lobelia laurentioides Schltr.
 Lobelia laxa MacOwan
 Lobelia laxiflora Kunth
 Lobelia leichhardii E.Wimm.
 Lobelia lepida E.Wimm.
 Lobelia leschenaultiana (C.Presl) Skottsb.
 Lobelia leucotos Albr.
 Lobelia limosa (Adamson) E.Wimm.
 Lobelia linarioides (C.Presl) A.DC.
 Lobelia lindblomii Mildbr.
 Lobelia linearis Thunb.
 Lobelia lingulata E.Wimm.
 Lobelia lisowskii Thulin
 Lobelia lithophila Senterre & Cast.-Campos
 Lobelia livingstoniana R.E.Fr.
 Lobelia lobata E.Wimm.
 Lobelia longicaulis Brandegee
 Lobelia longipedicellata C.E.C.Fisch.
 Lobelia longisepala Engl.
 Lobelia loochooensis Koidz.
 Lobelia lucayana Britton & Millsp.
 Lobelia lukwangulensis Engl.
 Lobelia luruniensis E.Wimm.
 Lobelia luzoniensis (Pers.) Merr.

M

 Lobelia macdonaldii B.L.Turner
 Lobelia macrocentron (Benth.) T.J.Ayers
 Lobelia macrodon (Hook.f.) Lammers
 Lobelia malowensis E.Wimm.
 Lobelia margarita E.Wimm.
 Lobelia martagon (Griseb.) Hitchc.
 Lobelia mcvaughii T.J.Ayers
 Lobelia melliana E.Wimm.
 Lobelia membranacea R.Br.
 Lobelia mexicana E.Wimm.
 Lobelia mezlerioides E.Wimm.
 Lobelia mildbraedii Engl.
 Lobelia minutula Engl.
 Lobelia modesta Wedd.
 Lobelia molleri Henriq.
 Lobelia monostachya (Rock) Lammers
 Lobelia montana Reinw. ex Blume
 Lobelia morogoroensis E.B.Knox & Pócs
 Lobelia muscoides Cham.

N

 Lobelia nana Kunth
 Lobelia neglecta Schult.
 Lobelia neumannii T.C.E.Fr.
 Lobelia nicotianifolia Roth
 Lobelia niihauensis H.St.John
 Lobelia nubicola McVaugh
 Lobelia nubigena J.Anthony
 Lobelia nugax E.Wimm.
 Lobelia nummularia Lam.
 Lobelia nummularioides Cham.
 Lobelia nuttallii Schult.

O

 Lobelia oahuensis Rock
 Lobelia oaxacana Rzed.
 Lobelia obconica E.Wimm.
 Lobelia occidentalis McVaugh & Huft
 Lobelia oligophylla (Wedd.) Lammers
 Lobelia oreas E.Wimm.
 Lobelia organensis Gardner
 Lobelia orientalis Rzed. & Calderón
 Lobelia origenes Lammers
 Lobelia ovina E.Wimm.
 Lobelia oxyphylla Urb.

P

 Lobelia paludigena Thulin
 Lobelia paludosa Nutt.
 Lobelia paranaensis R.Braga
 Lobelia parva Badré & Cadet
 Lobelia parvidentata L.O.Williams
 Lobelia parvisepala E.Wimm.
 Lobelia patula L.f.
 Lobelia pedunculata R.Br.
 Lobelia pentheri E.Wimm.
 Lobelia perpusilla Hook.f.
 Lobelia perrieri E.Wimm.
 Lobelia persicifolia Lam.
 Lobelia petiolata Huamán
 Lobelia philippinensis Skottsb.
 Lobelia physaloides A.Cunn.
 Lobelia pinifolia L.
 Lobelia platycalyx (F.Muell.) F.Muell.
 Lobelia plebeia E.Wimm.
 Lobelia pleotricha Diels
 Lobelia poetica E.Wimm.
 Lobelia polyphylla Hook. & Arn.
 Lobelia porphyrea Rzed. & Calderón
 Lobelia portoricensis (Vatke) Urb.
 Lobelia pratiana Gaudich. ex Lammers
 Lobelia pratioides Benth.
 Lobelia preslii A.DC.
 Lobelia pringlei S.Watson
 Lobelia proctorii Argent & P.Wilkie
 Lobelia psilostoma E.Wimm.
 Lobelia pteropoda (C.Presl) A.DC.
 Lobelia puberula Michx.
 Lobelia pubescens Aiton
 Lobelia pulchella Vatke
 Lobelia purpurascens R.Br.
 Lobelia purpusii Brandegee
 Lobelia pyramidalis Wall.

Q

 Lobelia quadrangularis R.Br.
 Lobelia quadrisepala (R.D.Good) E.Wimm.
 Lobelia quarreana E.Wimm.
 Lobelia quiexobrae Rzed.

R

 Lobelia rarifolia E.Wimm.
 Lobelia reinekeana E.Wimm.
 Lobelia reinwardtiana (C.Presl) A.DC.
 Lobelia remyi Rock
 Lobelia reniformis Cham.
 Lobelia reptans W.J.de Wilde & Duyfjes
 Lobelia reverchonii B.L.Turner
 Lobelia rhombifolia de Vriese
 Lobelia rhynchopetalum Hemsl.
 Lobelia rhytidosperma Benth.
 Lobelia ritabeaniana E.B.Knox
 Lobelia rivalis E.Wimm.
 Lobelia robusta Graham
 Lobelia × rogersii Bowden
 Lobelia rosalindae Rzed.
 Lobelia rosea Wall.
 Lobelia rotundifolia Juss. ex A.DC.
 Lobelia roughii Hook.f.
 Lobelia rubescens De Wild.
 Lobelia rzedowskii Art.Castro & I.Gut.

S

 Lobelia salicina Lam.
 Lobelia sancta Thulin
 Lobelia santa-luciae Rendle
 Lobelia santos-limae Brade
 Lobelia sapinii De Wild.
 Lobelia sartorii Vatke
 Lobelia saturninoi Art.Castro & I.Gut.
 Lobelia scaevolifolia Roxb.
 Lobelia scebelii Chiov.
 Lobelia schimperi Hochst. ex A.Rich.
 Lobelia scrobiculata E.Wimm.
 Lobelia seguinii H.Lév. & Vaniot
 Lobelia serpens Lam.
 Lobelia serratifolia W.J.de Wilde & Duyfjes
 Lobelia sessilifolia Lamb.
 Lobelia setacea Thunb.
 Lobelia setulosa E.Wimm.
 Lobelia shaferi Urb.
 Lobelia simplicicaulis R.Br.
 Lobelia simulans N.G.Walsh
 Lobelia sinaloae Sprague
 Lobelia siphilitica L.
 Lobelia solaris E.Wimm.
 Lobelia sonderiana (Kuntze) Lammers
 Lobelia spathopetala Diels
 Lobelia × speciosa Sweet
 Lobelia spicata Lam.
 Lobelia standleyi McVaugh
 Lobelia stellfeldii R.Braga
 Lobelia stenocarpa E.Wimm.
 Lobelia stenodonta (Fernald) McVaugh
 Lobelia stenophylla Benth.
 Lobelia stenosiphon (Adamson) E.Wimm.
 Lobelia stolonifera Donn.Sm.
 Lobelia stricklandiae Gilliland
 Lobelia stricta Sw.
 Lobelia stuhlmannii Schweinf. ex Stuhlmann
 Lobelia sublibera S.Watson
 Lobelia subnuda Benth.
 Lobelia subpubera Wedd.
 Lobelia subscaposa Rzed.
 Lobelia sulawesiensis Lammers
 Lobelia sumatrana Merr.
 Lobelia surrepens Hook.f.
 Lobelia sutherlandii E.Wimm.

T

 Lobelia taliensis Diels
 Lobelia tarsophora Seaton ex Greenm.
 Lobelia tatea (E.Wimm.) E.Wimm.
 Lobelia telekii Schweinf.
 Lobelia telephioides (C.Presl) A.DC.
 Lobelia tenera Kunth
 Lobelia tenuior R.Br.
 Lobelia terminalis C.B.Clarke
 Lobelia thapsoidea Schott ex Pohl
 Lobelia thermalis Thunb.
 Lobelia thorelii E.Wimm.
 Lobelia thuliniana E.B.Knox
 Lobelia tomentosa L.f.
 Lobelia trigonocaulis F.Muell.
 Lobelia tripartita Thulin
 Lobelia trullifolia Hemsl.
 Lobelia tupa L.

U

 Lobelia udzungwensis Thulin
 Lobelia uliginosa E.Wimm.
 Lobelia umbellifera McVaugh
 Lobelia urens L.

V

 Lobelia vagans Balf.f.
 Lobelia valida L.Bolus
 Lobelia vanreenensis (Kuntze) K.Schum.
 Lobelia victoriensis P.Royen
 Lobelia villaregalis T.J.Ayers
 Lobelia villosa (Rock) H.St.John & Hosaka
 Lobelia viridiflora McVaugh
 Lobelia vivaldii Lammers & Proctor
 Lobelia volcanica T.J.Ayers

W

 Lobelia wahiawa Lammers
 Lobelia walkeri (C.B.Clarke) W.J.de Wilde & Duyfjes
 Lobelia welwitschii Engl. & Diels
 Lobelia wilmsiana  Diels
 Lobelia winfridae Diels 
 Lobelia wollastonii Baker f.

X

 Lobelia xalapensis Kunth
 Lobelia xongorolana E.Wimm.

Y

 Lobelia yucatana E.Wimm.
 Lobelia yuccoides Hillebr.

Z

 Lobelia zelayensis Wilbur
 Lobelia zeylanica L.
 Lobelia zwartkopensis E.Wimm.

Notes

References

Lobelia